The 1966 United States Senate election in Montana took place on November 8, 1966. Incumbent United States Senator Lee Metcalf, who was first elected to the Senate in 1960, ran for re-election. He won the Democratic primary uncontested, and moved on to the general election, where he was opposed by Tim M. Babcock, the Republican nominee and the Governor of Montana. Though the race remained close, Metcalf was able to expand on his 1960 margin of victory, and defeated Babcock to win a second term.

Democratic primary

Candidates
Lee Metcalf, incumbent United States Senator

Results

Republican primary

Candidates
Tim M. Babcock, Governor of Montana

Results

General election

Results

See also 
 United States Senate elections, 1966

References

Montana
1966
1966 Montana elections